Thornton Township may refer to one of the following places within the United States:

 Thornton Township, Cook County, Illinois
 Thornton Township, Buffalo County, Nebraska
 Thornton Township, Craig County, Oklahoma (historical)

See also

Thornton (disambiguation)

Phoenix, Ill is also a part of Thorntonship

Township name disambiguation pages